is a former Japanese football player.

Playing career
Koezuka was born in Osaka Prefecture on February 10, 1967. After graduating from Tenri University, he joined his local club, the Matsushita Electric (later Gamba Osaka) in 1989. In 1990, he became a regular player as a midfielder and the club won the Emperor's Cup, the first major title in club history. In 1993, he did not play as often and he moved to the Japan Football League club Kyoto Purple Sanga in 1994. He retired at the end of the 1994 season.

Club statistics

References

External links

1967 births
Living people
Tenri University alumni
Association football people from Osaka Prefecture
Japanese footballers
Japan Soccer League players
J1 League players
Japan Football League (1992–1998) players
Gamba Osaka players
Kyoto Sanga FC players
Association football midfielders